Gornja Bodežišta is a village in the municipality of Gacko, Republika Srpska, Bosnia and Herzegovina.

References

Villages in Republika Srpska
Populated places in Gacko